Basterotiidae is a family of bivalves belonging to the order Galeommatida.

Genera:
 Anisodonta Deshayes, 1857
 Anisodonta alata (Powell, 1952)
 Anisodonta alata trigonia (Powell, 1952)
 Anisodonta pseudoscintilla Ponder, 1971
 Anisodonta carolina Dall, 1900
 Atopomya Oliver, 2013
 Basterotia Hörnes, 1859
 Basterotina Coan, 1999
 Ensitellops Olsson & Harbison, 1953
 Ensitellops pilsbryi (Dall, 1899)
 Ensitellops protexta (Conrad, 1841)
 Ensitellops tabula Olsson and Harbison, 1953
 Fulcrella Cossmann, 1886
 Isoconcha Dautzenberg & Fischer, 1911
 Paramya Conrad, 1860
 Physoida Pallary, 1900
 Saxicavella Fischer, 1878

References

Bivalves
Bivalve families